Milngavie railway station serves the town of Milngavie, East Dunbartonshire, near Glasgow in Scotland. The station is sited  from Glasgow Queen Street, measured via Maryhill. The station is managed by ScotRail, who also operate all services at the station, along the North Clyde and Argyle lines.

Its principal purpose today is as a commuter station for people working in Glasgow city centre. The station itself is a category B listed building.

History 

The station was opened in April 1863, and was then part of the Glasgow and Milngavie Junction Railway. Originally built with three platforms, one platform has since been removed. The land where the third platform once stood has been sold. The line was doubled in 1900, but was singled again in 1990.

During December 2020, the 141 metre long platforms were extended to 205 metres by reinstating 39 metres of unused platform and adding a further 25 metres of new platform. The project cost £5 million.

Location 

The first few hundred yards of the way follow the line of short spur along railway originally built to serve the Ellangowan Paper Mills.

Facilities 
Milngavie station has a ticket office and ticket machines, an accessible toilet, help points, a small cafe, a payphone, bike racks and benches. There is no taxi rank, but there is a car park. A pedestrian underpass links the station to the town centre, which is also pedestrianised, and the southern end of the West Highland Way long-distance footpath to Fort William. All of the station has step-free access.

Passenger volume 

The statistics cover twelve month periods that start in April.

Services 
On weekdays and Saturdays, trains run every 30 minutes to Springburn, via Glasgow Queen Street (low level). In the evenings and on Sundays, trains run to Motherwell, via Hamilton Central, at the same twice-hourly frequency.

References

External links

Video footage of Milngavie railway station

Category B listed buildings in East Dunbartonshire
Listed railway stations in Scotland
Railway stations in East Dunbartonshire
Former North British Railway stations
Railway stations in Great Britain opened in 1863
SPT railway stations
Railway stations served by ScotRail
Milngavie